Yedashe is a town in Taungoo District, Bago Region in Myanmar. It is the administrative seat of Yedashe Township.Technological University Toungoo is located near this township.

History 
Yedashe was the site of the battle of Yedashe in the larger Battle of the Yunnan-Burma Road, on 5-8 April 1942.

Notes

External links
"Yedashe Map — Satellite Images of Yedashe" Maplandia World Gazetteer

Township capitals of Myanmar
Populated places in Bago Region